Revolution, formerly Irn Bru Revolution, is an Arrow Development shuttle roller coaster at Blackpool Pleasure Beach. It was Europe's first fully looping roller coaster. The ride consists of two raised sections of track with a vertical loop in the centre. The train is launched off the first raised platform, into the loop, and up onto the second platform, where it repeats the process in reverse. As a result of the design, riders are required to climb a series of stairs to get to the loading station. Until the introduction of Infusion, it was the park's only looping coaster.

It is one of only three Arrow shuttle coasters in operation, the others being Diamond Back at Frontier City in Oklahoma City, Oklahoma, and Sidewinder at Elitch Gardens Theme Park in Denver, Colorado.

History
Revolution was designed by Arrow Development with steel fabrication by Watson Steel. It opened in 1979 as the first fully looping roller coaster in Europe. It was initially painted red and white, with the Union Flag painted on the front and back.

Later the ride was sponsored by Irn-Bru, titled "Irn Bru Revolution", and carried the Irn-Bru orange and blue colours. The sponsorship ended in 2011 and the ride then reverted to its former title.

In February 2012, the park confirmed that the ride would be closed for early parts of the season in order to be painted in a new colour theme - grey and white. It received a repaint for the 2017 season.

In popular culture
The ride was featured on the BBC show Jim'll Fix It when a group of Cub Scouts ate their lunch whilst riding the roller coaster.

A homage was featured on an advert for Irn-Bru soft drinks when a group of goths drank Irn-Bru whilst riding, resulting in them becoming completely drenched, in 2007.

References

Blackpool Pleasure Beach
Roller coasters in the United Kingdom
Roller coasters introduced in 1979
1979 establishments in England